Hans-Heinrich Döhler (5 December 1917 – 22 February 1943) was a German U-boat commander in World War II.

Naval career
Hans-Heinrich Döhler joined Nazi Germany's Kriegsmarine in 1937. He served on the heavy cruiser Deutschland (later renamed Lützow) from July 1939 to April 1940. He went through U-boat training from April to September 1940. From September 1940 to June 1941 he served with the 2. Unterseeboots-Lehrdivision (2. U-boat Training Division). He went out on two patrols with the boat, spending 67 days at sea. Döhler went through U-boat Commander training with the 26th U-boat Flotilla from November to December 1941. Upon completing the course he commanded the "duck" , a school boat, from 4 January 1942 to 24 September 1942. On 2 October 1942 Döhler took command of the Type VIIC boat . After only two weeks with the new command he left Bergen, Norway to his first war patrol in the North Atlantic. U-606 left for its second patrol on 4 January 1943 and spend 50 days in the North Atlantic. On 22 February Döhler sank two ships (12,302) and damaged one (4,959) from Convoy ON 166.

Fate
Döhler was killed on 22 February 1943 when U-606 was sunk in the North Atlantic by depth charges from the US coastguard cutter  and the Polish destroyer Burza.

Summary of Career

Ships sunk

Awards
Iron Cross 2nd Class - November 1939
U-boat War Badge 1939 - 9 November 1941
Iron Cross 1st Class - 6 December 1942

References

Bibliography

1917 births
1943 deaths
U-boat commanders (Kriegsmarine)
Recipients of the Iron Cross (1939), 1st class
Reichsmarine personnel
People from the Province of Schleswig-Holstein
Kriegsmarine personnel killed in World War II
People lost at sea
Military personnel from Schleswig-Holstein
People from Ostholstein